Sidney Independent School District is a public school district based in the community of Sidney, Texas (USA).

The district has one school that serves students in grades pre-kindergarten through twelve.

Academic achievement
In 2009, the school district was rated "academically acceptable" by the Texas Education Agency.

Athletics
Sidney High School athletics include six-man football, basketball, golf, tennis, track, Cross Country, and powerlifting. Junior High athletics include six-man football, Cross Country, track, and basketball.

See also

List of school districts in Texas 
List of high schools in Texas

References

External links
Sidney ISD

School districts in Comanche County, Texas